Thomas Foley, 1st Baron Foley (8 August 1716 – 18 November 1777), was a British landowner and politician.

Foley was the son of Thomas Foley MP and his wife Hester (née Andrews) and was educated at Westminster School (1724–732) and Trinity College, Cambridge (from 1732). The Foley family descended from the prominent ironmaster Thomas Foley.

He succeeded his father in 1749, inheriting the Stoke Edith estate in Herefordshire. Foley was also the cousin, namesake and heir of Thomas Foley, 2nd Baron Foley (a title which became extinct on the latter's death in 1766), thus also inheriting Witley Court and the extensive Great Witley estate.  This included ironworks at Wilden and Shelsley Walsh, which were leased about at the end of his life.

He was elected to the House of Commons for Droitwich in 1741, a constituency he represented until 1746 and again from 1754 to 1768, followed by election to represent Herefordshire between 1768 and 1776. The latter year the title previously held by his cousin was revived when Foley was raised to the peerage as Baron Foley of Kidderminster in the County of Worcester.

Lord Foley married Grace (d. 1769), daughter of George Granville, 1st Baron Lansdowne, in 1740. They had seven children:

 Thomas Foley, 2nd Baron Foley (1742–1793), to whose family he devised the Great Witley estate
 Grace Foley (1 January 1743 – 9 January 1813), married James Hamilton, 2nd Earl of Clanbrassil, on 21 May 1774
 Edward Foley (1747–1803), to whose family he devised his paternal Stoke Edith estate
 Andrew Foley (c. 1748–1816), to whose family he devised the Newent estate
 Anne Foley (d. 9 December 1794), married Sir Edward Winnington, 2nd Baronet on 12 September 1776
 Elizabeth Foley (bef. 1769 – 13 October 1776)
 Mary Foley (d. December 1844), married Richard Clerk

Foley died in November 1777, aged 61. He was succeeded in the barony by the eldest son, Thomas.

References 

 Kidd, Charles, Williamson, David (editors). Debrett's Peerage and Baronetage (1990 edition). New York: St Martin's Press, 1990.
 Will of 1st Lord Foley
 www.thepeerage.com
 

1716 births
1777 deaths
People from Malvern Hills District
People educated at Westminster School, London
Alumni of Trinity College, Cambridge
Peers of Great Britain created by George III
Politicians from Worcestershire
Politics of Herefordshire
English ironmasters
18th-century English businesspeople
Foley, Thomas
British MPs 1741–1747
British MPs 1754–1761
British MPs 1761–1768
British MPs 1768–1774
British MPs 1774–1780
Thomas
1